Macedonia is a village in Franklin and Hamilton counties, Illinois, United States. The population was 63 at the 2010 census.

The Hamilton County portion of Macedonia is part of the Mount Vernon Micropolitan Statistical Area.

History
The village was named after the kingdom of Macedonia.

Geography

Demographics

As of the census of 2000, there were 51 people, 17 households, and 14 families residing in the village. The racial makeup of the village was 100.00% White.

There were 17 households, out of which 29.4% had children under the age of 18 living with them, 70.6% were married couples living together, 11.8% had a female householder with no husband present, and 11.8% were non-families. 11.8% of all households were made up of individuals, and 5.9% had someone living alone who was 65 years of age or older. The average household size was 3.00 and the average family size was 3.27.

In the village, the population was spread out, with 31.4% under the age of 18, 5.9% from 18 to 24, 21.6% from 25 to 44, 31.4% from 45 to 64, and 9.8% who were 65 years of age or older. The median age was 40 years. For every 100 females, there were 155.0 males. For every 100 females age 18 and over, there were 118.8 males.

The median income for a household in the village was $24,375, and the median income for a family was $60,000. Males had a median income of $22,500 versus $18,750 for females. The per capita income for the village was $11,465. There were 7.1% of families and 23.6% of the population living below the poverty line, including 43.8% of under eighteens and 100.0% of those over 64.

References

 

Villages in Hamilton County, Illinois
Villages in Franklin County, Illinois
Villages in Illinois
Mount Vernon, Illinois micropolitan area
Populated places in Southern Illinois